Ethmia pseustis is a moth in the family Depressariidae. It is found in Australia, where it has been recorded from Queensland.

References

Moths described in 1942
pseustis